The 2000 United States presidential election in Arizona took place on November 7, 2000, and was part of the 2000 United States presidential election. Voters chose eight representatives, or electors to the Electoral College, who voted for president and vice president.

Arizona was won by Governor George W. Bush by a 6.3 point margin of victory. Ralph Nader received 3%, whilst all of the other candidates received a combined 1%. Pre-election polling showed that Bush had a solid lead over Gore. Bush won all the congressional districts, except Arizona's 2nd congressional district. The key for Bush's victory was Maricopa County, which has by far the highest population in the state. After breaking the longest Republican streak in the last election, last voting Democratic in 1948 prior to 1996, Arizona made a return to the Republican column in 2000. Bush made history by winning Greenlee County. This thinly populated working class county, which has been dependent on copper mining as the basis for its economy, had previously voted Democratic in every election since Arizona achieved statehood in 1912, but after flipping to the Republican column in 2000, it has not voted Democratic since.

Bush became the first Republican to win the White House without carrying Coconino or Pima Counties since Arizona statehood, as well as the first to do so without carrying Santa Cruz County since Herbert Hoover in 1928. As of 2020, this is the last time Arizona has voted to the left of Colorado or Virginia, and the last time it voted to the right of Tennessee. It also voted just under 0.1% to the left of West Virginia this election.

Arizona was 1 of 14 states to be carried at least once by Bill Clinton (having flipped the state in 1996) that voted against Gore whom at the time of the 2000 election was serving as Clinton’s Vice President.

Results

Results by county

Counties that flipped from Democratic to Republican
Gila (Largest city: Payson)
Greenlee (Largest city: Clifton)
La Paz (Largest city: Parker)
Navajo (Largest city: Show Low)
Pinal (Largest city: San Tan Valley)

Results by congressional district
Bush won five of six congressional districts.

Electors

Technically the voters of Arizona cast their ballots for electors: representatives to the Electoral College. Arizona is allocated eight electors because it has 6 congressional districts and 2 senators. All candidates who appear on the ballot or qualify to receive write-in votes must submit a list of 8 electors, who pledge to vote for their candidate and his or her running mate. Whoever wins the majority of votes in the state is awarded all 8 electoral votes. Their chosen electors then vote for president and vice president. Although electors are pledged to their candidate and running mate, they are not obligated to vote for them. An elector who votes for someone other than his or her candidate is known as a faithless elector.

The electors of each state and the District of Columbia met on December 18, 2000 to cast their votes for president and vice president. The Electoral College itself never meets as one body. Instead the electors from each state and the District of Columbia met in their respective capitols.

The following were the members of the Electoral College from the state. All were pledged to and voted for George W. Bush and Dick Cheney:
 Joe Arpaio
 Linda Barber
 Dennis Booth
 Webb Crockett
 Paul Robert Fannin
 LaVelle McCoy
 Susan Minnaugh
 Frank Straka

References

2000 Arizona elections
Arizona
2000